Muus Glacier is a glacier entering the north side of Odom Inlet between Snyder Peninsula and Strømme Ridge, on the east coast of Palmer Land. Mapped by the United States Geological Survey (USGS) in 1974. Named by Advisory Committee on Antarctic Names (US-ACAN) for David Muus, United States Antarctic Research Program (USARP) oceanographer aboard USCGC Northwind in the Ross Sea area, 1971–72, and a participant in the Weddell Sea Oceanographic Investigations aboard USCGC Glacier, 1974–75.

Glaciers of Palmer Land